The 2022 Eastern Washington Eagles football team represented Eastern Washington University as a member of the Big Sky Conference during the 2022 NCAA Division I FCS football season. Led by sixth-year head coach Aaron Best, the Eagles played their home games at Roos Field in Cheney, Washington.

Previous season

The Eagles finished the 2021 season with an overall record of 10–3 and a mark of 6–2 in conference play to place in a tie for second in the Big Sky. They received an at-large bid to the FCS playoffs, where they lost to the Big Sky team member Montana in the second round.

Preseason

Polls
On July 25, 2022, during the virtual Big Sky Kickoff, the Eagles were predicted to finish sixth in the Big Sky by both the coaches and media.

Preseason All–Big Sky team
The Eagles had two players selected to the preseason all-Big Sky team.

Offense

Efton Chism III  – WR

Defense

Joshua Jerome – DL

Roster

Schedule

Game summaries

Tennessee State

at Oregon

No. 4т Montana State

at Florida

at No. 7 Weber State

No. 5 Sacramento State

at Cal Poly

Portland State

at No. 15 Idaho

at No. 16 Montana

Northern Colorado

Ranking movements

Notes and references

Eastern Washington
Eastern Washington Eagles football seasons
Eastern Washington Eagles football